{{DISPLAYTITLE:C4H10O}}
The molecular formula C4H10O may refer to:

 Butanols
 n-Butanol
 sec-Butanol
 tert-Butanol
 Isobutanol
  Ethoxyethane (Diethyl ether)
 1-Methoxypropane (methyl propyl ether)
 2-Methoxypropane (isopropyl methyl ether)